Culstigh Creek is a stream in Cherokee County, Alabama, in the United States.

Culstigh is a name derived from the Cherokee language meaning "honey locust place".

See also
List of rivers of Alabama

References

Rivers of Cherokee County, Alabama
Rivers of Alabama
Alabama placenames of Native American origin